Dana Byron Bumgardner (May 16, 1954 – October 2, 2021) was an American businessman and politician who served as a Republican member of the North Carolina General Assembly from 2013 until his death. He represented the 109th district, representing a portion of Gaston County.

Life and career
Bumgardner was the president and CEO of LPM, Inc., a now-defunct label printing business in Dallas, North Carolina, and lived in Gastonia, North Carolina. Bumgardner died from liver cancer at his home in Gastonia on October 2, 2021, at age 67.

Electoral history

2020

2018

2016

2014

2012

Committee assignments

2021-2022 Session
Appropriations (Chair)
Appropriations - Transportation (Vice Chair)
Transportation
Insurance (Vice Chair)
Rules, Calendar, and Operations of the House

2019-2020 Session
Appropriations
Appropriations - Health and Human Services
Insurance (Chair)
Transportation
Finance
Rules, Calendar, and Operations of the House
Judiciary

2017-2018 Session
Appropriations
Appropriations - Transportation
Insurance (Chair)
Health Care Reform (Chair)
Transportation
Judiciary II
Energy and Public Utilities
Rules, Calendar, and Operations of the House

2015-2016 Session
Appropriations
Appropriations - Transportation
Insurance (Chair)
Transportation
Banking
Judiciary II
Public Utilities

2013-2014 Session
Appropriations
Commerce and Job Development
Education
Insurance
Transportation (Vice Chair)

References

External links

1954 births
2021 deaths
20th-century American businesspeople
21st-century American businesspeople
21st-century American politicians
American chief executives
Businesspeople from North Carolina
Deaths from cancer in North Carolina
Deaths from liver cancer
Republican Party members of the North Carolina House of Representatives
People from Gastonia, North Carolina